Lake Center Christian School is a private Christian school in Lake Township, between Uniontown and Hartville, Ohio, United States. The school teaches students from pre-school through 12th grade and is no longer affiliated with the Mennonite Church USA, but continues to be based on Mennonite principles. The school is accredited by the Association of Christian Schools International and Cognia.

History
Lake Center was established in September 1947 with 183 students. High school grades were added beginning in 2003 with the first graduating class in 2007, a class of 34 students.

In the summer of 2013 the school began fundraising in order to build the "cafenasium," a multifunctional addition that would serve as a cafeteria and a gymnasium, amongst other things. In May 2016, construction of the project commenced with a groundbreaking ceremony. The project was officially completed in 2020.

Extracurricular activities

Teams are fielded in baseball, basketball, cheerleading, golf, soccer, softball, cross country, track & field, bowling and volleyball.

Lake Center Christian began play in the Portage Trail Conference County Division in August 2015 after previously competing as an independent.

References

External links

Educational institutions established in 1947
High schools in Stark County, Ohio
Mennonite schools in the United States
Private high schools in Ohio
Private middle schools in Ohio
Private elementary schools in Ohio
1947 establishments in Ohio
Christian schools in Ohio